Mount Carmel High School may refer to:

Australia 
 Mount Carmel High School (Varroville), New South Wales

Canada 
 Our Lady of Mount Carmel Secondary School, in Mississauga, Ontario

India 
 Mount Carmel High School, Ahmedabad
 Mount Carmel High School, Gandhinagar Mount Carmel High School, Gandhinagar, Gujarat
 Mount Carmel High School (Akola), a Catholic co-educational school in Maharashtra
 Mount Carmel Girls' High School, Nagpur, a girls' school in Nagpur, Maharashtra
 Mount Carmel Convent High School, Chandrapur, Maharashtra
 Mount Carmel High School, Patna, a Catholic co-educational school in Bihar
 Mount Carmel School, Darjeeling
 Mount Carmel School Delhi
 Mount Carmel High School, Gaggal, Himachal Pradesh
Mount Carmel High School, Kosigi, Andhra Pradesh, India
 Carmel High School, Gadchiroli, Maharashtra India
 Mount Carmel High School, Jagtial, Telangana

United States 
 Mount Carmel High School (Chicago), Catholic boys school
 Mount Carmel High School (Los Angeles), closed 1976, demolished 1983, designated Los Angeles Historic-Cultural Monument
 Mt. Carmel High School (San Diego)    
 Mount Carmel High School (Mount Carmel, Illinois), serves all of Wabash County
 Mount Carmel Area High School in Mount Carmel, Pennsylvania 
 Mount Carmel High School (Texas) in Houston, Texas  
 Our Lady of Mount Carmel High School (Wyandotte, Michigan)
 Mount Carmel School (Northern Mariana Islands) - Saipan
 Mount Carmenl High School - Eastern Kentucky

United Kingdom
 Mount Carmel Catholic College for Girls, London
 Mount Carmel Roman Catholic High School, Accrington, Lancashire

See also
 Mount Carmel Academy (disambiguation)
 Carmel High (Fictional)